Nahim Khadi Jr. (born 16 August 1979) is a Sierra Leonean former professional footballer who is currently assistant manager at Dulwich Hamlet. He has most notably played for Coventry City and Crystal Palace, before moving down to the lower leagues. He became the first Bromley player to receive full international caps while at the club.

He is the son of Nahim Khadi, a former Sierra Leonean international footballer and the current president of the Sierra Leone Football Association.

External links

Sierra Leonean footballers
Living people
1979 births
Lewes F.C. players
Bromley F.C. players
Coventry City F.C. players
Crystal Palace F.C. players
Whyteleafe F.C. players
Slough Town F.C. players
Woking F.C. players
Kingstonian F.C. players
Sierra Leonean people of Lebanese descent
Sportspeople of Lebanese descent
Association football midfielders
Sierra Leone international footballers